Abbasabad is a village in Faragheh Rural District, in the Central District of Abarkuh County, Yazd Province, Iran. At the 2006 census, its population was 20, in 7 families.

References 

Populated places in Abarkuh County